Kuldar Sikk (born 20 June 1979) is an Estonian rally co-driver. From 2022 he is the co-driver of Benediktas Vanagas from Lithuania.

Dakar results

Rally career
Kuldar Sikk began his co-driver in 1998, co-driving for several drivers. In the 2003 Monte Carlo Rally, he made his WRC debut in a Suzuki Ignis S1600. The rally also marks the beginning of the partnership with Urmo Aava.

From 2010, Sikk became the co-driver of the rising star Ott Tänak. Two years later, in the 2012 Rally Sweden, the Estonian crew took their first stage win on SS14. Another five rounds later, Sikk achieved his first and only WRC podium finish.

After a short partnership with the Ukrainian rally driver Yuriy Protasov, he was co-driving for three more drivers in 2016 and 2017.

Starting from 2018 Rally Sweden, Sikk became the co-driver of Ken Torn in the Junior World Rally Championship.

Rally results

WRC results

References

External links

 Kuldar Sikk's e-wrc profile

1979 births
Living people
Estonian rally co-drivers
World Rally Championship co-drivers
People from Elva Parish
Dakar Rally co-drivers